Cheap Street in Bath, Somerset, England is adjacent to Bath Abbey and contains several listed buildings.

The road was known as Souter Street (meaning Shoemakers Street) until 1398.

Number 13 which adjoins the abbey and is Grade II* listed.

Number 14 was built around 1720. The central doorway is flanked on either side by pairs of windows with elliptical arches and Doric pilasters. There are also four Ionic pilasters and a central pediment on the 1st floor above the doorway and four Corinthian pilasters on the floor above that. It is adjacent to Marshal Wade's House in the Abbey Church Yard, and has been designated as a Grade I listed building.

Number 15 to 19 were built as a block, including shop fronts divided by Doric columns, by Thomas Baldwin around 1789.

Number 21 and The Roundhouse, which used to be known as the Abbey Wine Vaults, is a mid to late 19th century radiused round corner of Cheap Street and Stall Street.

See also

 List of Grade I listed buildings in Bath and North East Somerset

References

Grade I listed buildings in Bath, Somerset
Streets in Bath, Somerset